Matías Ramón Gutiérrez Raffault (born 4 March 1994) is an Argentine professional footballer who plays as a midfielder.

Career
Gutiérrez played for Boca Unidos at youth level, prior to beginning his senior career with local team Independiente (T). In 2017, he joined San Cayetano namesakes Independiente of Torneo Federal B. Nineteen appearances followed across that year's campaign. On 7 March 2018, Gutiérrez signed for Ferrocarril Sud. Five months later, in August, Gutiérrez joined Primera B Nacional side Santamarina after a successful trial. His professional debut subsequently came on 26 November during a 0–0 draw with Independiente Rivadavia.

Career statistics
.

References

External links

1994 births
Living people
Footballers from Buenos Aires
Argentine footballers
Association football midfielders
Primera Nacional players
Club y Biblioteca Ramón Santamarina footballers